Emma Reid (born 24 May 1995) is a British judoka.

Judo career
Reid is twice a champion of Great Britain, winning the half-heavyweight division at the British Judo Championships in 2015 and 2021.

She is the gold medallist of the 2021 Judo Grand Slam Abu Dhabi in the -78 kg category.

References

External links
 
 

1995 births
Living people
British female judoka
Judoka at the 2022 Commonwealth Games
20th-century British women
21st-century British women
Medallists at the 2022 Commonwealth Games
Commonwealth Games gold medallists for England
Commonwealth Games medallists in judo